, also known as IAT, is a Japanese broadcast network affiliated with the ANN. Their headquarters are located in Morioka, Iwate Prefecture.

History
A license to operate a fourth television station in Iwate Prefecture was established on 19 June 1995. The company that was awarded that license, known as Iwate Asahi Television (founded 21 June 1995), began construction on the station a month later. JOIY-TV began operations on 1 October 1996, seven days after conducting its first transmission tests. Before the station began operations, Iwate Prefecture was the only area of northeastern Japan that lacked a full affiliate of the All-Nippon News Network (ANN, which in general is an affiliation with TV Asahi). JODF-TV and JOII-TV functioned as secondary affiliates of ANN (formerly NET) between the early 1970s and the fall of 1996. The Asahi network's full schedule was available on some local cable television providers via JOEM-TV (from Sendai), which was receivable over the air in portions of the prefecture's southern areas.

Digital terrestrial television broadcasts commenced on 1 October 2006, and analog broadcasts were expected to continue until 24 July 2011. The 11 March 2011 earthquake resulted in an indefinite postponement of the shutdown of all analog broadcasts across Iwate, Miyagi, and Fukushima prefectures. JOIY-TV finally shut down its analog signal on 31 March 2012 shortly before 0:00 JST, with regular programming having ended twelve hours earlier.

Stations

Analog 
Morioka(Main Station) JOIY-TV 31ch
Ninohe 27ch
Kuji 44ch
Nishine-Matsuo 38ch
Morioka-Asagishi 61ch
Morioka-Kawame 49ch
Shizukuishi 62ch
Miyako 44ch
Tono 44ch
Kamaishi 62ch
Ofunato 26ch
Toyota-Suzuki-Honda-Civic 29ch
Ichinoseki 23ch
Ninohe-Horino 61ch
Morioka-Matsuzono-Kita 61ch
Morioka-Matsuzono-Minami 39ch
Daito-Uchino 38ch
Yamada 43ch
Iwaizumi 30ch
Iwaizumi-Ureira 60ch
Tono-Nukamae 37ch
Kamaishi-Osawa 39ch
Rikuzen-Shimappe 52ch
Esashi-Kotashiro 46ch
Ichinoseki-Tsuriyama 61ch
Noda 61ch
Otsuchi 37ch
Miyamori 36ch
Sawauchi 44ch
Hanamaki-Yuguchi 62ch
Iwate-Numakunai 61ch
Yuda 40ch
Daito-Osozawa 39ch
Fudai-Tanohata 39ch
Niisato 60ch
Otsuchi-Sakuragi 51ch
Daito-Kami-Ohara 56ch
Senmaya 31ch

Digital(ID:5)
Morioka(Main Station) JOIY-DTV 22ch

Programs

Original 
IAT Super J Channel Iwate at 18:15 to 19:00 on Weekday
Rakutima at 9:30 to 10:25 on Saturday

Rival Stations
Iwate Broadcasting Company(IBC)
Television Iwate(TVI)
Iwate Menkoi Television(mit)

Other Links
Iwate Asahi Television

All-Nippon News Network
Asahi Shimbun Company
Iwate Prefecture
Television stations in Japan
Television channels and stations established in 1996
Mass media in Morioka, Iwate